The ATP Tour is the elite tour for professional men's tennis organized by the Association of Tennis Professionals (ATP). The ATP Tour includes the four Grand Slam tournaments, the ATP World Tour Finals, the ATP Super 9, the Championship Series and the World Series tournaments.

Schedule 
This is the complete schedule of events on the 1998 ATP Tour, with player progression documented from the quarter-final stage.

Key

January

February

March

April

May

June

July

August

September

October

November

ATP rankings 
These are the rankings of the top twenty players of the ATP Tour, at the end of the 1997 ATP Tour, and of the 1998 season, with number of rankings points, highest and lowest position during the year, and number of spots gained or lost from 1997 to 1998.

Singles

Statistical information 
These tables present the number of singles (S), doubles (D), and mixed doubles (X) titles won by each player and each nation during the season, within all the tournament categories of the 1998 ATP Tour: the Grand Slam tournaments, the ATP Tour World Championships, the ATP Super 9, the ATP Championship Series, and the ATP World Series.

Titles won by player 

^ Rios also won the Grand Slam Cup, which on December 9, 1999, merged with the ATP Tour World Championship, the ATP's year-end tournament also held annually in Germany. This gave birth to the present ATP World Tour Finals.

Titles won by nation (singles):
  13 (San Jose, Philadelphia, Scottsdale, Barcelona, Orlando, Atlanta, Wimbledon, Washington, D.C., Los Angeles, Boston, Shanghai, Vienna, Ostrava, Stockholm)
  12 (Dubai, Estoril, Monte Carlo Masters, Hamburg Masters, French Open, Bologna, Gstaad, Kitzbühel, Indianapolis, Bournemouth, Bucharest, Lyon, Santiago, ATP Finals)
  10 (Adelaide, Memphis, Chennai, Coral Springs, London, 's-Hertogenbosch, Canada Masters, Cincinnati Masters, Long Island, US Open)
  7 (Auckland, Indian Wells Masters, Miami Masters, Rome Masters, St. Poelten, Grand Slam Cup, Singapore)
  6 (Marseille, Copenhagen, Munich, Nottingham, Båstad, Amsterdam)
  4 (Doha, Australian Open, Umag, Mexico City)
  4 (Antwerp, Tashkent, Basel, Paris Masters)
  4 (St. Petersburg, Rotterdam, Toulouse, Stuttgart Masters)
  3 (Prague, Stuttgart, Mallorca)
  3 (London, Halle, Moscow)
  3 (Sydney, San Marino, New Haven)
  2 (Palermo, Bogotá)
  2 (London, Halle)
  1 (Split)
  1 (Hong Kong)
  1 (Newport)
  1 (Casablanca)
  1 (Tokyo)

The following players won their first career title:
  Kenneth Carlsen – Hong Kong
  Scott Draper – London
  Andrea Gaudenzi – Casablanca
  Lleyton Hewitt – Adelaide
  Dominik Hrbatý – San Marino
  Andrew Ilie – Coral Springs
  Leander Paes – Newport
  Andrei Pavel – Tokyo
  Mariano Puerta – Palermo
  Mariano Zabaleta – Bogotá

See also 
 1998 WTA Tour – women's tour
 Association of Tennis Professionals
 International Tennis Federation

References 

 
ATP Tour
ATP Tour seasons